Warts and All: Volume 5 is a live album recorded on February 22, 2005 at the Val Air Ballroom in Des Moines, Iowa. It is the fifth set in a collection of commercially released full-concert live albums by the American jam band moe. Unlike most of the Warts and All releases, it does not contain any filler track(s). It was released on June 12, 2007.

This set features the first released versions of "George" and "Tijuana Donkey Show".

Track listing
All tracks recorded live on February 22, 2005 at the Val Air Ballroom in Des Moines, IA.

Disc one
 "intro" — 0:56
 "Bring You Down ->" (Schnier) — 12:45
 "Shoot First" (Garvey, moe.) — 7:42
 "Captain America ->" (Derhak) — 9:19
 "She" (Schnier) — 14:48
 "Y.O.Y. ->" (Garvey) — 7:59
 "George" (Schnier) — 15:33

Disc two
 "intro" — 1:24
 "Spine of a Dog ->" (Garvey) — 6:29
 "Mexico ->" (Schnier) — 21:51
 "Plane Crash ->" (Derhak) — 18:08
 "Spine of a Dog ->" (Garvey) — 4:37
 "Yodelittle" (Schnier) — 1:29

Disc three
 "Yodelittle ->" (Schnier) — 27:48
 "Spine of a Dog ->" (Garvey) — 6:42
 "Buster" (Derhak) — 13:09
 "Tijuana Donkey Show"* (Derhak) — 6:08
 "New York City"* (Derhak) — 5:11

 "Tijuana Donkey Show" and "New York City" were the encore songs.

Personnel 
moe.:
 Chuck Garvey — vocals, guitar, cover art
 Rob Derhak — vocals, bass guitar
 Vinnie Amico — drums
 Al Schnier — guitar, vocals, keyboards, Moog synthesizer
 Jim Loughlin — percussion, acoustic guitar
Production:
Becca Childs Derhak — art direction
Fred Kevorkian — mastering

Charts 
Album - Billboard

References

External links 
 News and Pictures

Moe (band) live albums
2007 live albums